Looking at Bird is a studio album by the American jazz saxophonist Archie Shepp and the bassist Niels-Henning Ørsted Pedersen, containing performances recorded in 1980 and released on the Danish-based SteepleChase label.  The album consists of duets on compositions written by, or associated with, Charlie Parker.

Reception
The AllMusic review by Scott Yanow stated: "Archie Shepp pays tribute to Bird not by copying him, but by being creative and playing Parker's repertoire in his own sound. Recommended."

Track listing
All compositions by Charlie Parker except as indicated
 "Moose the Mooche" - 6:26  
 "Embraceable You" (George Gershwin, Ira Gershwin) - 4:42  
 "Ornithology" (Benny Harris, Parker) - 5:45  
 "Billie's Bounce" - 5:24  
 "Yardbird Suite" - 4:38  
 "Blues for Alice" - 5:48  
 "How Deep Is the Ocean?" (Irving Berlin) - 5:54  
 "Confirmation" - 5:43

Personnel
Archie Shepp - soprano saxophone, tenor saxophone
Niels-Henning Ørsted Pedersen - bass

References

SteepleChase Records albums
Archie Shepp albums
Niels-Henning Ørsted Pedersen albums
1980 albums